Solano is a Spanish surname.  Notable people with the surname include:

Adrián Solano (born 1951), Costa Rican cyclist
Adrián Solano (cross-country skier) (born 1994), Venezuelan cross-country skier
Agustina Solano (born 1995), Chilean field hockey player
Álvaro Solano (born 1961), Costa Rican footballer
Andrés Felipe Solano (born 1977), Colombian writer
Andrés Solano (born 1998), Colombian footballer
Bastián Solano Molina (born 1999), Chilean footballer
Carlos Solano (born c. 1950), Costa Rican footballer
Chief Solano (c. 1798 – c. 1851), or Sem-Yeto, American Indian leader
Donovan Solano (born 1987), Colombian baseball player
Francisco Solano (disambiguation), several people with this name
Gelvis Solano (born 1994), Dominican basketball player
Gerardo Solano (1954–2000), Costa Rican footballer
Greg Solano (born 1963), American sheriff and politician
Hernán Solano (born 1967), Costa Rican politician
Humberto Solano (1944–2010), Costa Rican cyclist
Jasmine Solano, American musician and disc jockey
Jhonatan Solano (born 1985), Colombian baseball player
Joan Solano (born 1953), Spanish rower
Joaquín Solano (1913–2003), Mexican equestrian
Johanna Solano (born 1990), Costa Rican beauty queen
José Solano (disambiguation), several people with this name
José Antonio Solano (born 1985), Spanish footballer
Juan Solano (1504–1580), Spanish missionary
Juan Manuel Solano (born 1993), Colombian footballer
Juan Miguel Solano, Spanish actor
Julio Solano (born 1960), Dominican baseball pitcher
Marta Eugenia Solano Arias, Costa Rican lawyer and political scientist
Mateus Solano (born 1981), Brazilian actor
Miguel Solano (born 1946), Spanish rower
Naren Solano (born 1996), Colombian footballer
Nolberto Solano (born 1974), Peruvian footballer
Rafael Solano (born 1931), Dominican pianist, songwriter and ambassador to UNESCO
Rosalío Solano (1914–2009), Mexican cinematographer
Solita Solano (1888–1975), or Sarah Wilkinson, American journalist
Susana Solano (born 1946), Spanish sculptor
Vicente Solano Lima (1901–1984), Argentine newspaper publisher and politician
Vincent Solano (1923–1992), American gangster
Wes Solano (born c. 1970), or Jorge Solano Moreta, Puerto Rican drug trafficker
Wilebaldo Solano (1916–2010), Spanish Communist activist

See also
Solano (disambiguation)
José Solano y Bote (1726–1806), Spanish naval officer

Spanish-language surnames